Ice and Fire may refer to:

Literature
Ice and Fire, a 1986 novel by Andrea Dworkin
Ice and Fire, a 1988 novel in the Deathlands series by Laurence James
A Song of Ice and Fire, a series of fantasy novels by George R. R. Martin

Other uses
Ice and Fire (charity), a London-based charity exploring human rights through performance
Ice & Fire, a 1995 video game

See also
 Fire and Ice (disambiguation)